Calexico Unified School District is a school district in California. It has its headquarters in Calexico.

Schools
Adult center:
 Roberto F. Morales Adult Center

High schools:
 Calexico High School (zoned)
 De Anza 9th Grade Academy (zoned)
 Aurora High School (alternative)
 Calexico Community Day School (alternative)

Junior high schools:
 Enrique Camarena Junior High School
 William Moreno Junior High School

Primary schools:
 Blanche Charles Elementary School
 Cesar Chavez Elementary School
 Dool Elementary School
 Jefferson Elementary School
 Kennedy Gardens Elementary School
 Mains Elementary School
 Rockwood Elementary School

References

External links

 

Calexico, California
School districts in Imperial County, California